Rhacognathus punctatus, the Heather Bug, is a species of stink bugs (family Pentatomidae).

Description
This predatory stink bug has a mottled metallic bronze-brown shieldbug, extended shoulders, a pale longitudinal line on the pronotum and dark brown legs with a whitish band on the tibia. Females lay their eggs in May and June, while the adults are present throughout the year. Adults of these bugs prey on the larvae of leaf beetles and Chrysomelidae species, especially on the larvae of Lochmaea caprea and Lochmaea suturalis.

Distribution
This species is present in most of Europe.

Habitat
This stink bug prefers the edges of heaths, moors and lowland mires.

References 
 Biolib
 Fauna Europaea

External links
 British Bugs
 Commanster
 Virtual Fauna of Lakeland

Asopinae
Bugs described in 1758
Hemiptera of Europe
Taxa named by Carl Linnaeus